The Campeonato Mineiro de Futebol do Módulo I de 2009 was the 95th season of Minas Gerais's top-flight professional football league. The season began on January 25 and ended on May 3. Cruzeiro were crowned the league champion after going through the competition undefeated.

Participating teams

League table

Final Tournament

Finals

First leg

Second leg

References

External links 
 Official webpage 

Campeonato Mineiro seasons
Mineiro